Bethel Presbyterian Church may refer to:

in Singapore
 Bethel Presbyterian Church, Singapore

in the United States
 Bethel Presbyterian Church (Alcorn, Mississippi), listed on the NRHP in Mississippi
 Bethel Presbyterian Church (Bay, Missouri), a Presbyterian historic site
 Bethel Presbyterian Church (McLeansville, North Carolina), another Presbyterian historic site
 Bethel Presbyterian Church (Bethel Park, Pennsylvania), a church and Presbyterian historic site, associated with the Whiskey Rebellion
Bethel Presbyterian Church (Indiana, Pennsylvania), another Presbyterian historic site
 Bethel Presbyterian Church (Clover, South Carolina), listed on the NRHP in South Carolina
Bethel Presbyterian Church (Kingston, Tennessee), another Presbyterian historic site
 Bethel Presbyterian Church (Waverly, West Virginia)

See also
New Bethel Presbyterian Church, Piney Flats, Tennessee, a Presbyterian historic site